Jaz, also known as Jazmine Graham, is an American urban pop singer, based in Los Angeles, U.S. She has made herself known to the music community with the release of the official music video “Bout That” in 2014.

The young artist got her start by working with producer Remo the Hit Maker, who has previously worked with artists like 50 Cent’s signees Kid Kid and Jeremiah, Chrisette Michele, Lloyd Banks, Joe Budden, Nicole Scherzinger, Meek Mill, Swizz Beatz and on fourth studio album by American hip hop artist DJ Drama Quality Street Music.

Throughout her career Jaz has also worked with new wave artist and writer Taybell. After the success of "Bout That" music video, Jaz has partnered with a Grammy nominated producer and pianist Kevin Randolph and young writer Lynniah Herron. In addition, Jaz is working with Executive Talent TV scout Big Mike Rob. Besides, musical career Jaz has interest in community work. Recently she became one of a brand ambassadors of Monster.

References

Living people
21st-century African-American women singers
American women pop singers
Year of birth missing (living people)
American hip hop singers
American women rappers
21st-century American rappers
21st-century American women musicians
21st-century women rappers